Mahetlwe is a village in Kweneng District of Botswana. It is located around 25 km north-east of Molepolole, and the population was 591 in 2001 census.

References

Kweneng District
Villages in Botswana